The Consolidated Edison Building (also known as the Consolidated Gas Building and 4 Irving Place) is a neoclassical skyscraper in Gramercy Park, Manhattan, New York City, United States. The 26-story building was designed by the architectural firms of Warren and Wetmore and Henry Janeway Hardenbergh. The building takes up the western two-thirds of the block bounded by East 14th Street to the south, Irving Place to the west, 15th Street to the north, and Third Avenue to the east. It serves as the headquarters of energy company Consolidated Edison, also known as Con Ed.

The site formerly contained Tammany Hall and the Academy of Music, as well as the offices of Con Ed's predecessor, Consolidated Gas. The gas company was originally headquartered at 15th Street and Irving Place, but had outgrown its original building by the 1910s. As a result, Hardenbergh designed an expansion for the existing headquarters, which was constructed from 1911 to 1914. This expansion was later incorporated into a larger structure built by Warren and Wetmore between 1926 and 1929. Upon completion, the building's design was lauded by local media, and its "Tower of Light" became a symbol of the local skyline. On February 10, 2009, the building was declared a New York City designated landmark.

History

Site 
The site was originally occupied by the Lenape Native Americans until 1651, when a large tract from Bowery (now Fourth Avenue) to the East River between 3rd and 30th Streets was given to New Netherland director-general Peter Stuyvesant. The current building's site includes land from Stuyvesant, Williams, and auctioneer David Dunham. When the Manhattan street grid was laid out with the Commissioners' Plan of 1811, space was provided for what would become Union Square, one block west of the present-day Consolidated Edison Building, which opened in 1839. To the east of the square, between Fourth and Third Avenues, a community of rowhouses as well as a north–south street called Irving Place were developed by Samuel B. Ruggles.

The block now occupied by the Consolidated Edison Building was originally occupied by buildings of various uses, including rowhouses on 15th Street, the Fifteenth Street Presbyterian Church, and the New York University School of Medicine on 14th Street. The Manhattan Gas Light Company purchased land at the southeast corner of 15th Street and Irving Place in 1855, where it erected a Renaissance Revival office structure. Just south of the Gas Light Company's office was the Academy of Music, New York's third opera house, which opened in 1854. The structure burned down in 1866, destroying the blockfront on 14th Street between Third Avenue and Irving Place. The Academy of Music was rebuilt and continued to serve as an opera site until 1887, when it was turned into a movie theater. The Tammany Hall political organization purchased the former medical school site and built its headquarters building there. Another building on the present Consolidated Edison Building's site, a mansion at 2 Irving Place, served as headquarters for the Lotos Club.

Construction

Hardenbergh structure 
In the 1880s, at a time when competition between New York City's gas companies was high, the Manhattan Gas Light Company and several other gas companies combined to become the Consolidated Gas Company. By 1910, the original offices at 15th Street proved to be insufficient for the company's operations, and it had opened offices in several other buildings on the block, including the old Lotos Club house. As a result, Consolidated Gas hired Henry Janeway Hardenbergh to design a 12-story office building on that site. The building was to be erected in two phases so the company's operations could run with little interruption. The architect had previously constructed a showroom for the company.

The first phase of construction, between January and September 1911, entailed building a  building at 124-128 East 15th Street, which upon completion housed the company's subsidiaries and affiliates. The original headquarters and the Lotos Club house were originally retained as offices, but this soon proved to be insufficient as well. To support the additional stories, a truss system was built to distribute the weight between the older structures and the newer building.

Warren and Wetmore structure 
After the 19-story building was finished in 1914, Consolidated Gas rented out some of the additional space in the building, since at the time, the company did not need to use the entire floor area. A two-story building at 144 East 15th Street was added in 1915 and was used for showrooms. By the 1920s, however, Consolidated Gas had expanded into the outer boroughs, and there was need for even more office space. In 1925, the company purchased the Academy of Music, which hosted its last show the following May. Consolidated Gas commissioned Warren and Wetmore, which had previously designed some of the company's branch offices, as well as T.E. Murray, Inc., which built boiler plants and power-generating stations. Blueprints were submitted to the New York City Department of Buildings by October 1926 and the expansion was completed a little over two years later.

The Tammany Hall building on 14th Street was sold to Joseph P. Day and J. Clarence Davis, of real estate syndicate D&D Company, in December 1927. The society planned to relocate to the nearby 44 Union Square East, which was then under construction. D&D sold the Tammany building again to Consolidated Gas in January 1928. There were allegations that Tammany leaders profited from the sales, which Tammany leader George Washington Olvany denied. Day, a long-time member of Tammany Hall, eventually agreed to give the $70,000 profit from the sale to Tammany. Tammany Hall remained in its old headquarters until July 4, 1928, so it could celebrate the U.S. Independence Day at that location. Immediately afterward, it moved to a temporary space at 2 Park Avenue.

Plans for an annex were submitted to the Department of Buildings in September 1928 and the annex was finished by the following November. After the completion of this expansion, the Consolidated Gas building contained  of floor area, used by 7,000 employees.

Use 

A 1932 guidebook stated that Consolidated Gas had become the "largest company in the world providing electrical service". Four years later, Consolidated Gas was incorporated as the Consolidated Edison Company of New York, and its headquarters were renamed accordingly. By the 1970s, the headquarters had 6,000 employees. Con Ed continued to expand into adjacent states, though it still retains its headquarters at Gramercy Park.

The ground floor space was rented out to various tenants, including First National City Bank (now Citibank).  In 1975, the Fuerzas Armadas de Liberación Nacional Puertorriqueña, a Puerto Rican nationalist group, claimed responsibility for a bombing that caused minor damage to the building, but injured no one. The group also claimed responsibility for a similar bombing at the same site in 1978, which also caused little damage. By 2010, the space was occupied by such tenants as the New York Sports Club, the Apple Bank for Savings, and the Raymour & Flanigan furniture store.

Few alterations have been made to the facade since the 1920s expansions. In 1965–1966 the facade was repainted and given an acrylic emulsion. Other changes included reconfiguration of the 15th Street facade in 1954, as well as various component replacements and installations. The light bulbs on the tower's clock were replaced in 1994, the tower and facade were repaired from 1997 to 2001, and the light bulbs on the facade were replaced in 2008. In 2010, it was officially designated a city landmark by the New York City Landmarks Preservation Commission.

Architecture

The building is officially located at 4 Irving Place, though the building also takes up the lots between 2 and 10 Irving Place. For the structure, the architects worked out a limestone form with its corners clad in mock quoining. Courses of stone were raised to create a column of protruding blocks.

Hardenbergh structure 

The initial structure by Hardenbergh was one of the architect's last designs. The original plans called for a 12-story building with a facade made of limestone. In the original plans, the lowest three levels were to contain storefronts, with double-height segmental arches along the facade of the ground and second floors. On the middle seven levels, the windows were to be recessed into architectural bays, with each bay containing three windows on each floor. The top two levels were to contain windows that were recessed into the facade, separated by colonettes in the Ionic order, as well as decorated spandrels within the windows.

Hardenbergh's original plan called for the main entrance to be on 15th Street, but when the expanded building design was implemented, the main entrance was moved to Irving Place while the secondary entrance was moved to 15th Street. The Irving Place entrance was given a recessed portico supported by Ionic columns, while the 15th Street entrance was simpler in design. The original 12 stories remained mostly the same, but the 13th story of the building was distinguished by a "transitional" design with small cornices below and above that floor. The 14th through 17th floors contained piers between each recessed bay, which were supported by Ionic pilasters, while a projecting cornice was placed on the 18th floor. Elements of several architectural styles were used, including the Beaux-Arts base, Baroque midsection, and the Renaissance Revival and neoclassical decorations on top. Robert A. M. Stern wrote in 1983 that Hardenbergh's blending of styles—as used on another of his commissions, the Plaza Hotel near Central Park—demonstrated a "masterful combination of gemuetlichkeit and Classical rigor".

Illumination of the facade was a key part of the Hardenbergh design for the building: lamps were suspended beneath the cornice and on the roofline, and the storefronts at ground level were also illuminated. Even the use of limestone on the facade, instead of brick, was conducive to the illumination, as the limestone reflected the light generated by these lamps. The Real Estate Record & Guide cited the building's exterior illumination scheme as being "as interesting an example of decorative exterior lighting as has ever been attempted in New York City." Such illumination had been used previously in the city, notably at Luna Park and Dreamland amusement parks at Coney Island, as well as during the 1909 Hudson Fulton Celebration, when illumination was placed on the East River bridges and on major structures such as the Singer Building and the Plaza Hotel. However, it was still relatively rare for office buildings to be illuminated each night, though such lighting schemes were commonly tested at the premises of power companies. The lighting scheme was scrapped in the 1920s when the Warren and Wetmore tower was built.

Warren and Wetmore structure 
The design of the 26-story tower at Irving Place and 14th Street was similar to the Metropolitan Life Insurance Company Tower at Madison Avenue and 23rd Street. Two 18-story wings wrapping the tower were designed in a similar manner to Hardenbergh's structure. The decoration was similar to that of Hardenbergh's design, but with less detail. The base contained a three-story colonnade in the Doric style. Throughout the Warren and Wetmore section of the building, there is light-inspired ornamentation including depictions of urns, torches, lamps, thunderbolts, and suns. These decorations symbolize Con Ed's function as a power company, and by extension, a provider of light.

Rising above the base was a tower that was set back from the street, as required by the 1916 Zoning Resolution. The ornamentation at the tower's peak included urns and obelisks, which were normally associated with funereal aspects, and was modeled after the Mausoleum at Halicarnassus. These decorations memorialize Con Ed workers killed in World War I. The tower section was topped by a "Tower of Light" designed to look like a miniature temple, capped by a bronze lantern which lights up at night. Below the bronze lantern lies a recessed loggia of columns, which are lit up at night with various color themes. Under the column architecture, the tower includes four separate 16-foot wide clock faces on each side of the building. The lighting scheme on the Warren and Wetmore tower was first implemented in 1929. At the time, the lighting scheme was unusual in that it provided colored light, as opposed to the plain colors expressed by most other buildings' illuminations, and also was powered by electricity rather than gas.

The addition was widely lauded for its features. A critic in The New Yorker wrote in 1929 that the addition, "interestingly wedged in between the flanking buildings", included "a sturdy shaft, classic in detail and vigorous in silhouette". The New Yorker writer further explained that the building was well integrated into the features of the neighboring structures and employed a good use of setbacks, but that the cornice above the base was slightly offset. Another magazine, The Architect, stated that the design and decorations "made this a building of unusual merit and distinction", while W. Parker Chase wrote in 1933 that the Consolidated Edison Building was among the city's most "beautiful and magnificent structures". The lighting scheme was also praised. In the 1939 WPA Guide to New York City, workers for the Federal Writers' Project called the lighting scheme one of the city's "welcome landmarks", while in 1981, The New York Times described the Tower of Light as one of the "crowns of light" decorating the Manhattan skyline.

References
Notes

Citations

Sources

External links

 Consolidated Edison Building on CTBUH
 Consolidated Edison Building on Emporis
 Consolidated Edison Building on Skyscraperpage.com
 Consolidated Edison Building on Structurae

14th Street (Manhattan)
1920s architecture in the United States
1928 establishments in New York City
Beaux-Arts architecture in New York City
Gramercy Park
Henry Janeway Hardenbergh buildings
National Historic Landmarks in Manhattan
Neoclassical architecture in New York City
New York City Designated Landmarks in Manhattan
Office buildings completed in 1928
Skyscraper office buildings in Manhattan
Union Square, Manhattan
Warren and Wetmore buildings